The word Hilton or Hylton is a place name of English and Norwegian origin, which is also the source of a toponymic surname. At the time of the British Census of 1881, the frequency of the surname Hilton was highest in Lancashire (5.3 times the British average), followed by Sussex, Lincolnshire, Westmorland, Cheshire, Norfolk and Bedfordshire. Its frequency was below national average in all the other British counties. Sometimes Hilton is found as a given name.

Hilton Hotel dynasty

Members of the Hilton family associated with Conrad Hilton who founded Hilton hotels. This family take their name from a farm near Kløfta in Ullensaker, Norway.

Conrad Nicholson Hilton, Sr (1887–1979)
Conrad Nicholson "Nicky" Hilton, Jr. (1926–1969)
Conrad Nicholson Hilton III, born 1960
Michael Otis Hilton, born 1961
William Barron Hilton (1927–2019)
William Barron Hilton Jr, born 1948
Hawley Anne Hilton, born 1949
Steven Michael Hilton, born 1950
Nicholas Conrad Hilton, born 1984
David Alan Hilton, born 1952
Sharon Constance Hilton, born 1953
Richard Howard Hilton, born 1955, married to Kathy Hilton
Paris Whitney Hilton, born 1981
Nicholai "Nicky" Olivia Hilton, born 1983
Barron Nicholas Hilton, born 1989
Conrad Hughes Hilton, born 1994
Daniel Kevin Hilton, born 1962
Ronald Jeffrey Hilton, born 1963
Eric Michael Hilton, born 1932
Constance Francesca Hilton, (1947–2015)

Other people
Other people named Hilton or Hylton
Alfred B. Hilton, American Civil War soldier and Medal of Honor recipient
Clifford L. Hilton, American jurist
Daisy and Violet Hilton – conjoined twins
Dave Hilton, Sr. and Dave Hilton, Jr. – boxing champions 
Dave Hilton (rugby union), former rugby union player for Scotland
Donna Hylton, Jamaican-American kidnapper and murderer
Doug Hilton, Australian scientist 
Edward Hilton, survivor of the siege of Lucknow
Elliot Hilton, British figure skater
Gary Hilton, American serial killer
Frederick George Hilton Price (1842–1909), English antiquarian and banker, known as F. G. Hilton Price
Geoff Hilton, Australian politician
Harold Hilton, English golfer
Henry Hilton, American Businessman and judge
Herman Hilton, English rugby league footballer
Isabel Hilton, Scottish journalist
James Hilton, English novelist
Jennifer Hilton, Baroness Hilton of Eggardon, Labour peer, former metropolitan police commander.
Jim Hilton, Canadian businessman, advertiser and singer
Joe Hilton, English footballer
John Hilton (disambiguation), one of several people, including:
John Buxton Hilton (1921–1986), British crime writer
John Hilton (American football) (born 1942), former American football tight end
John Hilton (composer) (1599–1657), British composer
John Hilton (industrial relations) (1880–1943), British professor of industrial relations
John Hilton (surgeon) (1804–1878), British surgeon
Karen Hilton, British ballroom dancer
Keith Hylton, American lawyer
Lynn M. Hilton (1924–2020), American politician
Malcolm Hilton, Lancashire left arm spin bowler
Marcus Hilton, British ballroom dancer
Orrin N. Hilton, Colorado attorney and judge
Paul Hilton (disambiguation)
Perez Hilton, professional name of American blogger and media personality Mario Lavandeira (born 1978)
Peter J. Hilton – mathematician
Sir Peter Hilton – former Lord Lieutenant of Derbyshire
Robyn Hilton, American actress
Roger Hilton, British painter
Ronnie Hilton – British singer and radio presenter
Rose Hilton (1931–2019), British painter
 Scott Hilton (American football) (born 1954), American football linebacker
 Scott Hilton (politician), member of the Georgia House of Representatives 
Simon Hilton – English music film director and editor
Tyler Hilton – American singer-songwriter and actor
T. Y. Hilton – American football wide receiver
Vitorino Hilton – Brazilian footballer
William Hilton (disambiguation)
Baron Hylton, a British peerage
Brigitte Foster-Hylton, Jamaican hurdler
Jack Hylton, British bandleader and impresario
James Hylton, NASCAR racer
Javine Hylton, British singer also known as simply Javine
Leslie Hylton, West Indian cricketer
Ripton Joseph Hylton, the reggae singer Eek-A-Mouse

References

English-language surnames
English toponymic surnames